The 1939 Hardin–Simmons Cowboys football team was an American football team that represented Hardin–Simmons University as an independent during the 1939 college football season. In its fifth season under head coach Frank Kimbrough, the team compiled a 7–1–1 record and outscored opponents by a total of 137 to 54.

Schedule

References

Hardin-Simmons
Hardin–Simmons Cowboys football seasons
Hardin-Simmons Cowboys football